The Atlantic Coast Line Railroad's High Springs—Croom Line was a historic rail line in northern Florida.  The line dates back to the late 1800s and was used for both passengers and freight.

Route description
The High Springs—Croom Line began at the Atlantic Coast Line's High Springs Yard, where it also connected with their DuPont—Lakeland Line.  From High Springs, the line proceeded southeast to Gainesville and continued south through Ocala and Leesburg before reconnecting with the DuPont—Lakeland Line in Croom (originally known as Pemberton Ferry).

Branches
From Croom, the line continued west another ten miles to Brooksville, which was classified separately on employee timetables as the Brooksville Branch.

The High Springs—Croom Line also connected with the Atlantic Coast Line's Palatka Branch just south of Gainesville at Rochelle.  The Palatka Branch ran from Rochelle east to Palatka, where it connected with the Atlantic Coast Line's Main Line.  The line's Micanopy Branch ran from the line to the small town of Micanopy and Tacoma.  Further south, the High Springs—Croom Line also had a small branch to Citra and it also connected with the Leesburg Branch in Leesburg.

History

From High Springs to Gainesville, the line was built by Henry B. Plant in an effort to extend his railroad network further south to Charlotte Harbor.  From Gainesville south, the line was built by the Florida Southern Railway.  Henry Plant was unaware that the Florida Southern was building north to Gainesville and further north as he was building his line, the Live Oak, Tampa and Charlotte Harbor Railroad, south.  To prevent having competing lines, Plant made a mutually beneficial deal with the Florida Southern that essentially combined the two lines into one, connecting them in Gainesville.  The Florida Southern also The Florida Southern also built the Palatka Branch during their initial construction, as well as the branches to Micanopy and Citra.  The Florida Southern Railway would eventually become part of the Plant System.  After Plant's death, his network of railroads was sold to the Atlantic Coast Line Railroad (ACL) in 1902.

Initially, the Atlantic Coast Line used the Palatka Branch to run trains from Jacksonville to the High Springs—Croom Line, which then went south to Ocala and Tampa.  This changed in 1905 when the Atlantic Coast Line built a connection with the Jacksonville and Southwestern Railroad (J&SW), which the Atlantic Coast line bought a year prior.  The Atlantic Coast Line then used the J&SW line, which crossed the High Springs—Croom Line at Burnett's Lake (just north of Gainesville), for trains from Jacksonville since it was more direct and went through more communities.

The Atlantic Coast Line would sometimes refer to the High Springs—Croom Line as the "Florida Southern Route" (named after the predecessor that built the line) to differentiate it from their nearly parallel High Springs—Lakeland Line which was called the "West Coast Route" and was primarily a freight route.

In 1948, the Atlantic Coast Line rerouted the line in central Gainesville from Main Street to instead run along 6th Street, where they built a new depot.  This rerouted segment used the former right of way of the Gainesville and Gulf Railroad.

For much of its history, the Atlantic Coast Line's West Coast Champion and an additional local passenger train ran the line round-trip daily on its route from Jacksonville to St. Petersburg.  Trains continued to come in from Jacksonville via the Jacksonville—Wilcox Line at Burnett's Lake.  By the 1950s, a local freight train was running the line from High Springs to Croom six days a week.  A mixed train (with both passengers and freight) also ran the line from Burnett's Lake to High Springs six days a week.

In 1967, the Atlantic Coast Line became the Seaboard Coast Line Railroad (SCL) after merging with its rival, the Seaboard Air Line Railroad (whose main line ran relatively close to the High Springs—Croom Line).  In the Seaboard Coast Line era, both the High Springs—Croom Line and the Jacksonville—Wilcox Line were designated as the Ocala Subdivision.  A local passenger train would continue to use the line up until 1971 when Amtrak took over the Seaboard Coast Line's passenger operations.

By 1982, the Seaboard Coast Line abandoned the line from High Springs to Burnett's Lake, and track south of Micanopy Junction was broken up into segments.  By 1989, track was abandoned from Gainesville to Rochelle (along with the Palatka Branch east to Hawthorne).

Current conditions
Some segments of the High Springs—Croom Line remain active today and some abandoned segments have since become rail trails.

The line is still in service from Burnett's Lake to just north of Gainesville.  This line is now CSX's Deerhaven Subdivision.

The Gainesville-Hawthorne State Trail runs on the former right of way between Gainesville and Rochelle.
  
The line is still active between Lowell, Ocala, and Candler.  This segment is operated by the Florida Northern Railroad, a shortline run by Regional Rail, LLC, which crosses the S Line in Ocala.

A short segment was still active near Leesburg which had been operated by the Florida Midland Railroad since 1987 (this line also used former Seaboard track from Wildwood to Leesburg).  This line was abandoned in late 2000.

The Good Neighbor Trail runs on the former right of way between Croom and Brooksville.

Historic stations

See also
Main Line (Atlantic Coast Line Railroad)
DuPont—Lakeland Line

Notes

References

Atlantic Coast Line Railroad
Rail infrastructure in Florida